Scopula pauperata is a moth of the  family Geometridae. It is found on Borneo. The habitat consists of lowland forests.

Adults are white with a variable grey fasciation and suffusion.

References

Moths described in 1861
pauperata
Moths of Asia